Delivery may refer to:

Biology and medicine
Childbirth
Drug delivery
Gene delivery

Business and law
Delivery (commerce), of goods, e.g.:
Pizza delivery
Milk delivery
Food delivery
Online grocer
Deed ("delivery" in contract law), as in "signed, sealed & delivered"
Power delivery or electricity delivery, the process that goes from generation of electricity in the power station to use by the consumer

Film and television
Delivering (film), a 1993 short film by Todd Field
Delivery (2005 film), an animated short film
Delivery (2013 film), an American horror film
"Delivery", the final episode of Men Behaving Badly
Julia Zemiro's Home Delivery,  a 2013 Australian television comedy interview series
"The Delivery" (The Office), a 2010 episode of The Office
Delivery (web series), a 2021 South Korean web drama.

Music
Deliver (The Mamas & The Papas album), 1967
Deliver (The Oak Ridge Boys album), 1983
Deliverin', a 1971 album by Poco
"Deliver" (song), a 2017 song by Fifth Harmony
"Deliver", a song by Lupe Fiasco from Tetsuo & Youth
"Delivery" (song), a 2007 single by Babyshambles
Delivery (band), a British rock band
Delivery (Australian band), an Australian garage-funk band

Literature
  The Delivery, a novel by Peter Mendelsund

Other uses
Delivery (cricket), in cricket, a single action of bowling a cricket ball towards the batsman
Delivery (joke), of a joke

See also
Deliverance (disambiguation)
Delivery service (disambiguation)